Sebastian Melrose (born 12 January 1998) is a Scottish racing driver who last competed in the Ginetta GT4 Supercup for Team HARD. He was born in Bathgate, Scotland. He is a holder of the Indian Motor Racing Club (SMRC) rising star award, winner of the Ecurie Ecosse Hubcap and is also the godson of 4 time IndyCar Series champion and 3 time Indy 500 champion Dario Franchitti. He is also known for appearing on the fourth season of the Netflix reality show Too Hot To Handle.

Career 

At the age of 16, Melrose's first race was at Knockhill in Scotland, March 2014,followed by his first away race at Brands Hatch later that year, October 2014. There he entered the Formula Ford Festival, progressing to the festival's final with a notable a top 20 finish  the youngest driver to have achieved this. He was awarded the SMRC rising star award for Formula Ford 1600 as a result, as well as his professional approach away from the car.

Previously racing in the Formula Ford 1600 series with the Graham Brunton Racing team, Melrose finished his second season 5th in the championship standings with 140 points. In 2016, he finished 3rd and won the SMRC Best Young Single Seater Driver accolade. In 2017 Melrose finished 2nd in the Scottish Championship, winning the David Leslie Trophy along the way. In the same season he won Champion of Brands while racing at Brands Hatch circuit. Another second place was secured in the 2018 season.

In April 2019 Melrose took the step into closed wheel racing by joining Walkenhorst Motorsport in Germany to race a BMW in the VLN Series at the Nordschleife Nurburgring.

In 2021, Melrose would make the step-up to the Ginetta GT4 Supercup, racing with Team HARD.

Personal life
Melrose was born in Scotland to a Scottish father and Salvadoran mother.

Racing record

Racing career summary

References

External links 
 Sebastian Melrose Official Website
 The Scottish Motor Racing Club Website
 

1997 births
Living people
Scottish racing drivers
Scottish people of Salvadoran descent
Formula Ford drivers
Ginetta GT4 Supercup drivers
Salvadoran sportspeople
People from Bathgate